The Social Christian Unity Party is a centre-right political party in Costa Rica.

PUSC considers itself a Christian-democratic party and, as such, is a member of the Christian Democrat Organization of America (ODCA). It was founded in 1983 by merger of the parties that were part of the Unity Coalition: the Christian Democratic, the Republican Calderonista, People's Union and the Democratic Renovation Party. Its historical roots are in Calderonism, i.e. the movement of supporters of Rafael Ángel Calderón Guardia, who was the country's president in the 1940s. From its foundation until 2006, the PUSC was one of Costa Rica's two dominant parties, alongside the National Liberation Party. It provided three presidents: Rafael Ángel Calderón Fournier (1990–94), Miguel Ángel Rodríguez (1998–2002) and Abel Pacheco (2002–06).

History 

Negotiations among the main right-wing opposition parties to create a political force capable of confronting the National Libertation Party (PLN) started as early as 1973. Yet, wasn’t until 1977 that four political parties; People's Union (liberal), Christian Democratic Party (Christian Democracy), Republican Calderonista (Calderonism) and Democratic Renovation (Social democracy) united forces in the Unity Coalition. After a primary election Rodrigo Carazo became the alliance's nominee gaining victory in the 1978 general election. The Coalition not only achieved the Presidency but also a non-PLN parliamentary majority for the first time since PLN's foundation. Yet, Carazo's administration was very unpopular due to the economic crisis and the tensions with neighbor Nicaragua due to Costa Rica's support of the rebel guerrilla FSLN. Thus, Rafael Ángel Calderón Fournier the Coalition's candidate in the 1982 general election suffered a debacle gaining only 33% of the votes and PLN obtaining a landslide victory. Even though, Unity remained as the second political force.

On December 17, 1983, the four parties merged in the Social Christian Unity Party, not without certain controversy especially among certain factions in the Democratic Renovation. Costa Rica's law required for every party in the coalition to merge in order to be valid and also to be able of receiving the so call “political debt” (State's contribution to parties after the election proportional to their electoral support). After a series of complex sessions, Democratic Renovation's National Assembly finally agree by a slight majority to merge and PUSC was born and Costa Rica passed from a dominant-party system into a two-party system with PLN and PUSC as main political forces.

PUSC’ first primary was held on February 27, 1989. Calderón Fournier faces Miguel Ángel Rodríguez Calderón winning with 75% of the votes. Calderón, as son of Rafael Ángel Calderón Guardia, the historical leader of Calderonism and the social reforms of the 40s, was seen as the most representative leader of PUSC, while Rodríguez came from the liberal faction inside the party. This division between liberals and calderonistas was going to survive for the rest of the Party's history.

In the 1990 election following that primary Calderón won over PLN's candidate Carlos Manuel Castillo. A second primary was held on June 1993 between Rodríguez and Juan José Trejos (son of former president José Joaquín Trejos), this time Rodríguez turned victorious with 75% but lost to PLN's candidate José María Figueres in 1994. With Rodríguez as candidate the party did won both Presidency and parliamentary majority in the 1998 election, this time without the need for primaries.

Next primary was held on June 10, 2001 between then deputy and TV personality Dr. Abel Pacheco de la Espriella and former minister Rodolfo Mendez Mata. Even though Mata was endorsed by Calderón, Pacheco won the primary with 76% of the votes. Pacheco won the 2002 election over PLN's candidate Rolando Araya making it the first time a party other than PLN kept in power by two consecutive terms since 1948.

Corruption scandals 
In 2004-2005 a series of corruption scandals involved three former presidents of Costa Rica; Rafael Ángel Calderón Fournier, Miguel Ángel Rodríguez Echeverría and José María Figueres Olsen. All of them suspects of bribery and enticement. They were accused of receiving money in exchange for guaranteeing very profitable contracts between private companies Alcatel and Fischel with State's corporations. The scandals even caused Calderón and Rodríguez to be arrested, prosecuted and in Calderón's case condemned, while Figueres wasn’t arrested as he was in a non-extraditable country. Rodríguez was acquitted on a technicality.

Results after the scandals 

The party's candidate in 2006 right after the scandals was Pacheco's Prime Minister Ricardo Toledo. Toledo received only 3% of the votes, an unthinkable result for what was once one of Costa Rica's main parties. Anti-corruption party Citizens Action saw an increase in its support receiving almost as many votes as PLN and replacing PUSC as PLN's main rival. PUSC also passed from 17 to 5 seats after the 2006 parliamentary election and from 58 to 9 mayors in that year's municipal election.

In 2010 the party's nominee was former Vice President Luis Fishman. Fishman was the first Jewish presidential candidate in Costa Rica's history and gained 5% of the votes keeping the 5 seats. In 2013 Calderón suggested Dr. Rodolfo Hernández, then director of Costa Rica's Children's Hospital, as 2014's presidential nominee. Hernández faces former minister in Miguel Ángel Rodríguez’ cabinet Rodolfo Piza in the 2013 party primary showing, again, the traditional fight between the Calderonist and Liberal factions (the liberals having control over the National Committee). Also, as usual for a victorious candidate in PUSC's primaries, Hernández won with 75% of the votes.

Hernández received very good support and for a while was the second most popular candidate after PLN's Johnny Araya. Yet Hernández resigns as candidate on October 3, 2013 alleging constant backstabbing and treacheries from PUSC's authorities, so the party's nomination was taken by Rodolfo Piza. Piza obtained only 6% of the vote (as slight improvement) and was the fifth candidate in popular vote, but most notable was PUSC's increase in the parliamentary vote becoming the fourth most voted party surpassing Libertarian Movement (till then normally the third-largest party since 2006) and increasing its legislative caucus from six to eight seats.

In 2015 Calderón and his followers left the party and founded a new one called Social Christian Republican Party (an allusion to Calderón's father historical party). Nevertheless, PUSC saw a victory in the 2016 municipal election gaining second place in municipal votes surpassing ruling PAC and receiving much more votes than Calderón's new party. PUSC obtained 15 mayors (second in number after PLN) and saw an increase in its electoral support, unlike PLN that although the more voted party did saw a decrease in support.

In 2016, the PUSC declared themselves in favor of equal rights for same-sex couples in terms of marital property, insurance with the Costa Rican Social Security Fund (CCSS) and death  inheritance, while still not supporting same-sex marriage.

Electoral performance

Presidential

Parliamentary

References

External links
Official Website

Christian democratic parties in North America
Political parties in Costa Rica